Schistochlamys is a genus of Neotropical birds in the tanager family Thraupidae.

Taxonomy and species list
The genus Schistochlamys was introduced in 1850 by the German naturalist Ludwig Reichenbach. The type species is a subspecies of the cinnamon tanager with the trinomial Schistochlamys ruficapillus capistrata. The genus name combines the Late Latin schistus meaning "slate" and the Ancient Greek khlamus meaning "mantle" or "cloak".

The genus contains two species:

References

 
Bird genera
Taxa named by Ludwig Reichenbach